Adecco General Staffing, Australia is one of the largest providers of employment placement and recruitment services in Australia. The company employs about 400 employees across 19 offices all over the country, with headquarters in Southbank, Victoria.
Adecco General Staffing is part of Adecco Holdings Pty Limited, which is a wholly owned subsidiary of the Swiss-based Adecco Group.

History
1981: Adia Personnel Services entered the Australian market.

1988: Adecco Holdings Pty Limited was incorporated in New South Wales.

1996: Personnel services firms Ecco and Adia Interim merged to form the global Adecco group. Operations were combined to form a network of 2,500 branches, the largest in the world.

Services
Adecco General Staffing, Australia specializes in providing temporary staffing, permanent job placement, outsourcing, temp-to-hire, consulting, training, assessment and vendor management services for Office Support, Contact Centre, Trades, Manufacturing & Operations, Transport & Logistics, Government, Sales, Marketing and Events.

References 

Business services companies established in 1988
Employment agencies of Australia